Milicogate is a corruption scandal involving officers and funds of the Chilean Army. The corruption scheme involved fraud and misappropriation of the public funds of  Ley Reservada del Cobre.  The case became known when in a story published by journalist Mauricio Weibel in The Clinic in 2015. By March 2019 As of March2019 investigations by prosecutors showed that at least 6,100 million Chilean pesos had been missappropiated. Among the military personnel sentenced in the case is former commander-in-chief of the Chilean Army Juan Miguel Fuente-Alba who is serving a prison sentence.

References

Chilean Army
Corruption in Chile